Child development in Africa addresses the variables and social changes that occur in African children from infancy through adolescence. Three complementary lines of scholarship have sought to generate knowledge about child development in Africa, specifically rooted in endogenous, African ways of knowing: analysis of traditional proverbs, theory-building, and documentation of parental ethno-theories. The  first approach has examined the indigenous formulations of child development and socialisation values embedded in African languages and oral traditions. Several collections of proverbs have been published in different African languages, and their content has been analysed to show the recurrence of the themes of shared communal responsibility for children's moral guidance and the importance of providing it early in life.

Nsamenang's view 
The African social ontogeny proposed by Nsamenang is phrased within an eco-cultural perspective, and draws from writings by African scholars in philosophy and the humanities. The theory explains a worldview shared among various ethnic groups, and is grounded in systematic observational research and personal experience of the socialisation practices of the rural Nso people of Cameroon. The growth of social selfhood takes place in seven phases, each characterized by a developmental task. In the first phase, the naming ceremony projects the kind of socialized being the neonate should become. The major task of this phase is success in social priming: babies are cuddled and teased to smile along with adults; parents and other caregivers offer food items and playthings, and lure them verbally and nonverbally to return the ‘gifts’ – a prelude towards induction into the ‘sharing and exchange norms’ that bond the social system. Rabain and Mtonga describe similar infant teasing practices among the Wolof of Senegal and among the Chewa and Tumbuka of Zambia. Such interactions are believed to cultivate generosity.

The second phase, ‘social apprenticing’, roughly corresponds with childhood. Its principal task is to recognize and rehearse social roles that pertain to four hierarchical spheres of life: self, household, network, and public. Adults assign responsibility to preadolescent and adolescent children including the care and socialization of younger children which serves the function of priming the emergence of social responsibility. The priming strategies embedded in indigenous African childcare practices have important implications for the design of culturally appropriate forms of intervention to optimize developmental opportunities for children. In many African communities, far from a form of exploitation, caregiving responsibilities assigned to preadolescents and adolescents are part of ‘an indigenous educational strategy that keeps children in contact with existential realities and the activities of daily life [that] represents the participatory component of social integration’. A case study in Zambia found that this strategy was successfully integrated into a service-learning programme at a primary school that promoted social responsibility among both girls and boys and generated improved academic performance.

The generalisability of Nsamenang's ‘West African’ theory across the many different societies in sub-Saharan Africa is debatable. For instance, there are mother-infant interactions among the Gusii of rural Kenya in the 1950s and 1970s that stands in marked contrast to Nsamenang's description of social priming through cuddling and teasing. Gusii mothers, ‘are not expected to talk to or gaze at their infants or play with them’, and they explain how this (strange to Western eyes) emotional detachment is compatible with healthy emotional development in later life. Part of their explanation is that the infants receive playful stimulation and emotional support from their elder siblings and other child caregivers. The contrast between these ethnographic accounts serves as a warning that wide variations occur across different ethnocultural groups within the African region, and that further detailed research on socialization practices is needed.

African games and songs 
Another significant feature of the developmental niche described by many researchers on African early childhood is the prominence of elaborate play activities, unsupervised by adults. Marfo and Biersteker note that while major Western psychological theories attribute to play an important role in child development, this is mainly focused on cognition, whereas anthropological studies in Africa have emphasised that play also serves as an interactive process of social enculturation, structuring opportunities for the rehearsal, critique and appropriation of cultural practices. The cognitive and social structure of African games has been extensively documented. Music and dance are notably rich dimensions of most African cultures and children participate in both from an early age. Mtonga analysed the texts of Chewa and Tumbuka children's songs and games observed in rural and urban areas of Zambia, highlighting how they reveal ‘reasoning and understanding the psychology of other participants’, and ‘playful and skilful manipulation of certain word-sounds in order to distort meaning, create new concepts, or paint a satirical caricature...’. He also notes that children's play in these communities is generally inclusive of multiple age groups and of children with physical handicaps.

Yet indigenous games are seldom deployed as resources for enrichment in early childhood care and education (ECCE) programmes in Africa, despite the heavy emphasis on play in the curricula imported from Western preschool orthodoxy. Okwany, Ngutuku and Muhangi describe a number of recent initiatives in Kenya and Uganda where a systematic attempt was made to ‘leverage indigenous knowledge for child care’, by deploying local traditional songs, proverbs, and food production, preparation and preservation practices as resources for the enrichment of children's intellectual, emotional and nutritional development, rather than ‘downgrading’ them in favour of those imported from the West. Unfortunately, as Hyde and Kabiru note, such efforts are relatively rare, and ‘centre-based programmes in Africa tend to be heavily influenced by Western culture and sometimes are not relevant to the needs of children and society’.

Child-to-Child approach (CtC) 
Despite robust efforts by African governments over recent decades to broaden access to schooling, the structure of formal educational provision in most countries requires most of those who start out in Grade 1 to ‘drop out’ long before completion of the full 12-year curriculum. Thus the process of formal education is perceived by teachers, parents and pupils alike as one in which students are challenged to climb up a narrowing staircase. Dropping out at earlier stages is perceived as failure, and the individual's return to the community a source of disappointment. The experience of a few years of schooling is not generally perceived as adding value to the individual's productive capacity within the community. Thus, the purpose of schooling is widely understood as extractive recruitment of the best and brightest individuals out of the community into a higher, powerful, elite social stratum. A number of different ways of focusing education have been proposed in search of alternatives to the narrowing staircase model, including apprenticeship, lifelong learning, school production units, health education, and the Child-to-Child approach (CtC).

CtC is designed to mobilise children as agents of health education. It differs from the narrowing staircase model by focusing on the promotion of social responsibility in pre-adolescent children, an educational goal that resonates with the Chewa concept of nzelu. The widespread African practice of entrusting preadolescent children with the care of younger siblings was a major inspiration for the original proponents of CtC, which has been applied in more than 80 countries worldwide. A case study was conducted of integrative curriculum development by a group of Zambian primary school teachers using the CtC approach. The insight that pre-adolescent children can take on responsibility as agents of infant care and nurture, within the context of primary health care and progressive social change, was re-appropriated by the African teachers at this school as a way of incorporating traditional cultural practices into the formal educational process. Striking long-term benefits were claimed by the graduates of the school's CtC curriculum, including a growth of egalitarian relations between the genders, even within adult marriages.

See also 
 Child development
 Education in Africa

Sources

References

Free content from UNESCO
Child development
Early childhood education
Education in Africa